Adaray is a short-line commuter rail service operating between Adapazarı and Arifiye in Sakarya, Turkey. Commuter service on the line was introduced in 2013 in order to compensate for the discontinuation of the popular Haydarpaşa-Adapazarı Regional. Along with the three existing stations on the  line (Adapazarı, Mithatpaşa and Arifiye), five new small stations, consisting of a single island platform, were added.

When regional train service to Istanbul was restored on 5 January 2015, via the Ada Express, Adaray served as a connection between the train's final stop in Arifiye to the city center of Adapazarı.

Stations list

References

Railway companies established in 2013
2013 establishments in Turkey
Railway companies of Turkey
Government railway authorities
Transport in Sakarya Province
Adapazarı
Arifiye